Line 11 of the Guangzhou Metro is a rapid transit rail line under construction in Guangzhou.

Summary 
The line forms a  ring around the edge of the dense central areas of Guangzhou, allowing circumferential and tangential traffic to avoid transferring at the congested city center stations. As such, 19 of the line's 32 stations plan to have transfers with other lines. In addition, the line will act as a distributor for the numerous Pearl River Delta Metropolitan Region intercity railways, and the suburban radial subway lines (Guangzhou Metro Line 14, Line 21, Line 22 and Foshan Metro Line 11) that are expected to terminate at stations on Line 11.

Due to the large number of connections and destinations, the line is expected to have a ridership of over 1.2 million passengers per day. To cope with the projected high demand, engineers designed the line to be the second in the system to use high-capacity 8-car wide-body type A trains.

History 
In 1997 the "Guangzhou City Rapid Rail Transit Network Planning Study (Final Report)" proposed ring line 5 as an alternative to the B program. It followed a closed loop roughly along Newport Road, Changgang Road, Fangcun Avenue, Huangsha Avenue, Huanshi Road and the current Guangzhou New Central Axis. However, the final recommendation was for the  A-ring program, so it was not adopted.

In 2008 a new round of rail transit network planning again proposed a loop line. This time it was to follow Xingang Road and the Changgang Road Corridor of Line 8 in the Haizhu Section, with respective "inner ring" and "outer ring" schemes. As the new central axis and Central City Road in the 1997 Line B proposal became Line 3 and Line 5 respectively, between the two schemes, the northeast half-ring was extended via Guangyuan Road, Tianhe North Road, Zhongshan Avenue and Tianfu Road to access Pazhou Station. The difference between the two programs lies in the direction of the western half. The "Little Ring" program was to connect Guangzhou Railway Station along Industrial Avenue, Kangwang Road, Liwan Road and Zhanqian Road. In 1997 the "Grand Central" program was to pass Fenghuang Xincun Station and follow the route of Fangcun Boulevard and Huangsha Avenue and Central City Hall to reach Guangzhou Railway Station, but was realigned along Guangyuan Road. The final "grand scheme" was adopted; however, the already-completed Pazhou-Wansheng section was transferred to other routes, leading to a temporary extension of Line 8 to Culture Park in the Fenghuang New Town.

When the plan was formally chosen in 2010, it was decided to not split Line 8, retaining its original "L"-shaped route. All sections of the ring line would be completely new. Therefore, the "Grand Central" Southern Half Ring was also extended to Yat King Road in the Shin Khouang Corridor, south of Line 8, becoming an outer ring named Route 11, essentially following the current route. At the same time, it was also planned to increase the number of stations to 32. The final decision was to add only one station, but cancel Ruibao station. However, as the proposed route crossed Baiyun Mountain and Haizhu Wetland, concerns were raised by environmental groups. In the following 2014 proposal, the Admiralty–Yuntai Garden segment was realigned from under Baiyun Mountain to below Guangyuan Middle Road. Due to the restructuring, the original main entrance of Yuntai Garden Station was moved  to the south, to street level in Guangyuan Middle Road. Additionally, a secondary exit was removed the Haizhu Wetland.

In 2012, Line 11 was included in Guangzhou Metro's 12th Five-Year Plan and approved. January 2015, the Environmental Impact Assessment for Line 11 was approved by the Provincial Environmental Protection Agency. In July 2015 the project feasibility report was approved. At the end of 2015, Yuexiu District applied for the cancellation of Tianxincun Station due to difficulties with site clearing, but in late September 2016 the station was approved for construction. On September 28, 2016, construction officially started.

In order to connect Line 21 to the metro line network in the central city, the section from Tianhe Park Station to Yuancun Station was given priority for construction to be loaned to Line 21 for operation. With the opening of Line 21's Western section, it was be used first. Until the completion of the construction of Line 11, this section will be detached from Line 21 and the platform facilities will be rebuilt before returning to Line 11 for operation.

Stations

References

11
Railway loop lines